West Valley High School can refer to:

 West Valley High School (Alaska), Fairbanks, Alaska
 West Valley High School (Cottonwood, California), Cottonwood, California
 West Valley High School (Hemet, California), Hemet, California
 West Valley High School (Spokane, Washington), Spokane, Washington
 West Valley High School (Yakima, Washington), Yakima, Washington